Ilona Hegedűs is a Hungarian writer of science fiction, fantasy and horror poetry, writing in English, who has written Unearthly Companion (2005), a book of speculative poetry with poems nominated for Muses Prize and James B. Baker Award. She was the editor of the European Reader magazine (2006–2010).
She is also well known as a book reviewer.
Some of her poems have been published in the US, UK, France, Greece and Hungary.

See also
 Hegedűs
 Ilona

External links 
 Official website
 Author's blog
 Author's blog in Hungarian 

Year of birth missing (living people)
Living people
Hungarian editors
Hungarian women editors
Hungarian women novelists
Hungarian women poets
21st-century Hungarian poets
Hungarian science fiction writers
Hungarian fantasy writers
21st-century Hungarian women writers
21st-century Hungarian novelists